Makare Desilets (born June 26, 1976) is a retired American female volleyball player. She was part of the United States women's national volleyball team at the 1998 FIVB Volleyball Women's World Championship in Japan.

References

External links

http://usatoday30.usatoday.com/sports/olympics/athens/gymnastics/2004-06-22-wilson-family-ties_x.htm
http://www.gohuskies.com/sports/1998/2/3/208221966.aspx

1976 births
Living people
American women's volleyball players
Place of birth missing (living people)
21st-century American women
Washington Huskies women's volleyball players